Cavaglia railway station is a railway station in the village of Cavaglia, within the municipality of Poschiavo in the Swiss canton of Graubünden. It is located on the Bernina line of the Rhaetian Railway.

The station has three through tracks and two sidings. All three through tracks are served by platforms and station buildings.

The section of line between Ospizio Bernina and Poschiavo, on which the station is located, was opened in 1910. Initially Cavaglia was simply a crossing loop, but in 1911 it became the winter terminus of the southern section of the line, with the line over the Bernina pass operating only during the summer months, a situation that continued until the winter of 1913/4. The current station building was opened in 1912 as a privately owned hotel, being taken over by the railway in 1925, when a station office and waiting room was added.

A popular tourist destination near this stop are a series of pot holes (giant's kettle).

Services
The following services stop at Cavaglia:

References

External links
 
 
 Cavaglia glacier garden

Railway stations in Switzerland opened in 1910
Railway stations in Graubünden
Rhaetian Railway stations
Poschiavo